The XIV 2019 Oceania Badminton Championships was the continental badminton championships in Oceania sanctioned by the Badminton Oceania, and Badminton World Federation. This championship was organized by Badminton Victoria, and was the 14th edition of the Oceania Badminton Championships. It was held in Melbourne, Australia from 11 to 14 February 2019. The individual event started on 11 February, while the team event started on 15 February.

Venue  
The tournament was held at the Melbourne Sports & Aquatic Centre, Melbourne, Australia.

Medalists

Individual event

Mixed team event

Medal summary

Individual event 
The individual event of the 2019 Oceania Badminton Championships was held from 11 to 14 February, at the Melbourne Sports & Aquatic Centre, in Melbourne, Australia.

Participants

 (53)
 (1)
 (7)
 (2)

 (11)
 (18)
 (7)
 (10)

Men's singles

Seeds

 Abhinav Manota (semifinals)
 Daniel Fan (quarterfinals)
 Pit Seng Low (quarterfinals)
 Anthony Joe (quarterfinals)
 Rémi Rossi (final)
 Oscar Guo (champion)
 Peter Yan (quarterfinals)
 Jacob Schueler (second round)

Finals

Top half

Section 1

Section 2

Bottom half

Section 3

Section 4

Women's singles

Seeds

 Chen Hsuan-yu (champion)
 Louisa Ma (semifinals)
 Jennifer Tam (quarterfinals)
 Sally Fu (semifinals)

Finals

Top half

Section 1

Section 2

Bottom half

Section 3

Section 4

Men's doubles

Seeds

 Simon Leung / Mitchell Wheller (final)
 Cham Chen / Toby Wong (second round)
 Oliver Leydon-Davis / Abhinav Manota (second round)
 Lukas Defolky / Raymond Tam (semifinals)

Finals

Top half

Section 1

Section 2

Bottom half

Section 3

Section 4

Women's doubles

Seeds

 Setyana Mapasa / Gronya Somerville (champions)
 Sally Fu / Alyssa Tagle (quarterfinals)
 Yingzi Jiang / Louisa Ma (final)
 Ingrid Ateni / Esther Tau (second round)

Finals

Top half

Section 1

Section 2

Bottom half

Section 3

Section 4

Mixed doubles

Seeds

 Simon Leung / Gronya Somerville (champions)
 Jonathan Curtin / Erena Calder-Hawkins (second round)
 Peter Yan / Talia Saunders (quarterfinals)
 Ahmad Ali / Andra Whiteside (first round)
 Huaidong Tang / Setyana Mapasa (semifinals)
 Sawan Serasinghe / Lee Yen Khoo (final)
 Oliver Leydon-Davis / Anona Pak (quarterfinals)
 Maika Phillips / Alyssa Tagle (second round)

Finals

Top half

Section 1

Section 2

Bottom half

Section 3

Section 4

Team event

Teams 

 (12)
 (8)
 (4)
 (11)
 (11)
 (6)
 (9)

Squads

Seeds 
The seeding, which is based on BWF world rankings:

Results

References

External links 
 Tournament Link – Oceania Championships 2019 – Individual events
 Tournament Link – Oceania Championships 2019 – Team events

Oceania Badminton Championships
Oceania Badminton Championships
International sports competitions hosted by Australia
Badminton tournaments in Australia
Oceania Badminton Championships